Randall A. "Randy" Burckhard (born 1952) is an American politician. He is a member of the North Dakota State Senate from the 5th District, serving since 2011. He is a member of the Republican party.

References

1952 births
21st-century American politicians
Living people
Republican Party North Dakota state senators
People from Rugby, North Dakota